Centro de Futebol Zico de Brasília Sociedade Esportiva, also known as CFZ de Brasília, are a Brazilian football team from Brasília, Distrito Federal. They won the Campeonato Brasiliense in 2002, and competed in the Copa do Brasil in 2003 and in 2005.

History
Centro de Futebol Zico de Brasília Sociedade Esportiva were founded on August 1, 1999 by former footballer Zico as a branch of Rio de Janeiro state club Centro de Futebol Zico Sociedade Esportiva. CFZ de Brasília professionalized their football section on July 15, 2001. The club won the Campeonato Brasiliense in 2002. That season's top goalscorer was CFZ de Brasília's Tiano, with 21 goals.

Copa do Brasil
CFZ de Brasília competed in the Copa do Brasil in 2003, when they were eliminated in the first stage by Fortaleza, and in 2005, when they were eliminated in the first stage by Coritiba.

Achievements

Regional 
 Campeonato Brasiliense:
 Winners (1): 2002
 Campeonato Brasiliense Segunda Divisão:
 Winners (1): 2010

Current squad
As of December 2010, according to combined sources on the official website.

Youth squad

Professional players able to play in the youth team

Youth players with first team experience

Out on loan

First-team staff
As of December 28, 2010

Noted players
This is a list of noted footballers who have played for CFZ de Brasília whether or not they have a Wikipedia article. Players who have made significant/notable contribution to the club are included.

List of players
As of December 28, 2010.

Statistics correct as of match played December 28, 2010

Noted coaches
The following is a list of Centro de Futebol Zico de Brasília Sociedade Esportiva coaches.

Stadiums

Mané Garrincha Stadium
CFZ de Brasília play their home games at Mané Garrincha. The stadium has a maximum capacity of 15,000 people.

Presidents
 Eduardo Carlos dos Santos (?)

See also
Centro de Futebol Zico Sociedade Esportiva

References

External links
Centro de Futebol Zico de Brasília Sociedade Esportiva official website 
Zico official website 

Association football clubs established in 1999
Football clubs in Brasília
1999 establishments in Brazil